The New Indian Express is an Indian English-language broadsheet daily newspaper published by the Chennai-based Express Publications. It was founded in 1932 as The Indian Express, under the ownership of Chennai-based P. Varadarajulu Naidu. In 1991, following the death of owner Ramnath Goenka, his family split the group into two companies. Initially, the two groups shared the Indian Express title, as well as editorial and other resources. But on 13 August 1999, the northern editions, headquartered in Mumbai, retained the Indian Express moniker, while the southern editions became The New Indian Express. 
 Santwana Bhattacharya was appointed Editor-in-Chief on 1 July 2022, replacing G.S. Vasu.

History
Indian Express was first published on September 5, 1932, in Madras (now Chennai) by an Ayurvedic doctor and Indian National Congress member P Varadarajulu Naidu, publishing from the same press where he ran the Tamil Nadu Tamil weekly. But soon, on account of financial difficulties, he sold it to S. Sadanand, founder of The Free Press Journal, another English newspaper.

In 1933, The Indian Express opened its second office in Madurai and launched the Tamil daily Dinamani on September 11, 1934. Sadanand introduced several innovations and reduced the price, but later sold part of his stake in the form of convertible debentures to Ramnath Goenka due to financial difficulties. When The Free Press Journal further went into financial decline in 1935, Sadanand lost ownership of Indian Express after a long controversial court battle with Goenka, where blows were exchanged. Finally, a year later, Goenka bought the rest of the 26 per cent stake from Sadanand, and the paper came under his control, who took the already anti-establishment tone of the paper to greater heights. At that time it had to face stiff competition from the well-established The Hindu and the Mail, besides other prominent newspapers. In the late 1930s, the circulation was no more than 2,000.

In 1939 Goenka bought out Andhra Prabha, a prominent Telugu daily. It gained the name Three Musketeers for the three dailies. In 1940 the whole premises were gutted by fire. The Hindu, its rival, helped considerably in re-launching the paper, by getting it printed temporarily at one of its Swadesimithran's press and later offering its recently vacated premises in Madras at 2, Mount Road later to become the landmark Express Estates. This relocation helped the Express obtain better high-speed printing machines.

In later years, Goenka  started the Mumbai edition with the landmark Express Towers as his office when the Morning Standard was bought by him in 1944. Two years later it became the Mumbai edition of The Indian Express. Later on, editions were started in  cities like Madurai (1957), Bangalore (1965) and Ahmedabad (1968). The Financial Express was launched in 1961 from Mumbai, a Bangalore edition of Andhra Prabha was launched in 1965, and Gujarati dailies Lok Satta and Jansatta in 1952, from Ahmedabad and Baroda.

The Delhi edition started was when the Tej group's Indian News Chronicle was acquired in 1951, which from 1953 became the Delhi edition of Indian Express. In 1990 it bought the Sterling group of magazines and, along with it, the Gentleman magazine.

After Goenka's demise in 1991, two of the family members split the group into Indian Express Mumbai with all the north Indian editions, while the southern editions were grouped as Express Publications (Madurai) Limited with Chennai as headquarters.

Editions
The New Indian Express is now published from all 22 major cities in Andhra Pradesh, Karnataka, Kerala, Odisha, Tamil Nadu and Telangana.

Circulation

The New Indian Express has a net paid circulation of 595,618 copies. NIE achieves its biggest penetration (paid sales per head of population) in the state of Kerala. It claims to be the first Indian newspaper to give insurance benefits to its subscribers. It is published in a geographical area that covers approximately 24 per cent of the national population. The New Sunday Express (the Sunday edition of the NIE) is arguably the flagship publication, with magazine supplements incorporating national and international themes and sections on developmental issues, society, politics, literature, arts, cinema, travel, lifestyle, sports, new-age living, self-development and entertainment.

Recent changes

During late 2007/early 2008, there was a big shakeout of editorial staff, with many old hands leaving to make way for new. In April 2008, the newspaper underwent a major, drastic and exceptionally modern layout and design makeover and launched a huge advertising campaign.

In October 2007, The New Indian Express launched a 40-page Friday magazine supplement (now, total colour) called Indulge exclusively for the Chennai edition. In September 2010, the lifestyle pullout began a Bangalore edition.

Websites 
The New Indian Express Group of Companies also publishes Dinamani in Tamil and the following magazines: Cinema Express (Tamil), Samakalika Malayalam Vaarika (Malayalam), in addition to the website Edex Live.

See also
 Indian Express Group
 The Indian Express
 List of newspapers in India by circulation
 List of newspapers in the world by circulation

References

External links
Epaper

Publications established in 1932
Publications established in 1991
English-language newspapers published in India
Mass media in Tamil Nadu
Newspapers published in Coimbatore
Newspapers published in Tiruchirappalli
Mass media in Madurai
1991 establishments in Tamil Nadu
Companies based in Chennai